Vingtaine de St. Nicolas is one of the five vingtaines of St Peter Parish on the Channel Island of Jersey.

St. Nicolas
St. Nicolas